Edílson (born 1971) is a Brazilian footballer.

Edílson may also refer to:
Edílson Pereira de Carvalho (born 1962), Brazilian football referee
Alexandre Edílson de Freitas (born 1976), Brazilian footballer
Edílson José da Silva (born 1978), Brazilian footballer
Edílson Mendes Guimarães (born 1986), Brazilian footballer

Given names